John H. Moore (1939–2016) was an American anthropology professor.

John H. Moore may also refer to:

John H. Moore II (1927–2013), U.S. federal judge in New Jersey
John Henry Moore (Texas settler) (1800–1880), early colonist in Mexican Texas
John Henry Moore (mayor), mayor of Brantford, Ontario in 1851
John Henry Moore (American Horror Story), a fictional character
John Howard Moore (1862–1916), American zoologist, philosopher, educator, humanitarian and socialist

See also
John Moore (disambiguation)
Henry Moore (disambiguation)